Will Hamill (born 17 November 2000) is an Australian rules footballer who plays for the Adelaide Crows in the Australian Football League (AFL). He was recruited by the Adelaide Crows with the 30th draft pick in the 2018 AFL draft.

Early Football
Hamill represented Vic Country at the AFL Under 18 Championships for the 2018 season. He also played with the Dandenong Stingrays in the NAB League for two seasons, named as one of the best in their premiership in 2018.

AFL career
Hamill debuted in the Crows' fifty-three point loss against the Gold Coast Suns in the third round of the 2020 AFL season. He collected 9 disposals, 2 marks and one tackle in his first game.

Statistics
Statistics are correct to round 2, 2021 

|-
| scope="row" style="text-align:center" | 2019
|  || 17 || 0 || — || — || — || — || — || — || — || — || — || — || — || — || — || —
|- style="background:#EAEAEA"
| scope="row" text-align:center | 2020
| 
| 17 || 8 || 0 || 0 || 33 || 35 || 68 || 15 || 14 || 0.0 || 0.0 || 4.1 || 4.4 || 8.5 || 1.9 || 1.8 
|- 
| scope="row" style="text-align:center" | 2021
|  || 17 || 2 || 0 || 0 || 10 || 7 || 17 || 0 || 7 || 0.0 || 0.0 || 5.0 || 3.5 || 8.5 || 0.0 || 3.5
|-style="background:#EAEAEA; font-weight:bold; width:2em"
| scope="row" text-align:center class="sortbottom" colspan=3 | Career
| 10
| 0
| 0
| 43
| 42
| 85
| 15
| 21
| 0.0
| 0.0
| 4.3
| 4.2
| 8.5
| 1.5
| 2.1
|}

References

External links

2000 births
Living people
Adelaide Football Club players
Australian rules footballers from Melbourne
Dandenong Stingrays players
People from Dromana, Victoria